Kerans v. Porter Paint Co. was a leading case in Ohio on employer liability for workplace sexual harassment. In an opinion by Alice Robie Resnick, the court held that victims of harassment could bring tort claims against their employers. Resnick held that the psychological and emotional damages suffered by victims of harassment were not injuries under Ohio's workers' compensation statute, and employers were vicariously liable for the sexual harassment of their employees when they knew or should have known about the harassment.

Notes

External links
 Case Note: Sexual Harassment Claims and Ohio's Workers' Compensation Statute, 61 U. Cin. L. Rev. 1515

Ohio state case law
United States tort case law
1991 in case law